Stephen Gill (born 1971) is a British experimental, conceptual and documentary photographer, whose work has been exhibited internationally along with his books that are a key aspect to Gill’s practice.

Photographic practice 

Gill is a British photographer, who mainly draws inspiration from his immediate surroundings of inner city life in East London and more recently Sweden with an attempt to make work that reflects, responds and describes the times we live in.

His work is often made up of long-term photo studies exploring and responding to the subjects in great depth.

After working mainly in black and white from 1984, his practice since the mid 1990s was mostly in colour.

Until 2003 his work mostly had a descriptive and typographical approach towards the subjects. Eight of his photo studies made between 1997 and 2003 were assembled and published as chapters in a book called Field Studies in 2004, which also toured as an exhibition.

In January 2003 Gill bought a Bakelite 1960s box camera made by Coronet for 50 pence at Hackney Wick Sunday market, near where he lived. The camera had a plastic lens, and it lacked focus and exposure controls.

Over the next four years he had used the camera to photograph within the extremely varied environment of Hackney Wick, including waterways and allotments; and to make portraits of people at the Sunday market and who lived and worked in the area.

The subject parameters to this long-term obsession were geographical rather than conceptual.

The lack of image clarity that the plastic camera offered aligned very much with Gill's frame of mind at the time. As such images seemed to deny information, but somehow managed to retain a heightened sense of place and allow the images to breath without forcing a point.

It was later announced that the area Gill had been extensively photographing would be redeveloped for the 2012 Summer Olympics and 2012 Summer Paralympics.

Gill claims that this finished body of work was steered, informed and shaped by the place itself. And his approach to making the work was more reacting, responding and being carried by the subject rather than seeking out ideas that were already formed in the mind.

Gill described this period of working as walking away from photography or almost starting again, putting content first and technique second whilst aiming to also work with photography’s weaknesses rather than its descriptive strengths.

Having been attempting to take steps backwards and thus encouraging an element of chance to play a part in the image making, Gill hoped it allowed the subjects to unfold and not be suffocated by the technical parameters that the medium so often imposes.

Gill did not want to undermine photography’s strengths, however there was a new understanding that straight descriptive photography was not always able to grasp and convey all ideas.

In the 2005 series Buried, he made photographs in Hackney Wick and took the C-type prints back to the area and buried them in the ground. The prints were left up to seven to ten days with the hope that the place itself would leave its mark and the spirit of the place would be felt in the final work. He saw this as collaboration with place.

An obsession with this part of London lasted over ten years and led to many different series including – Hackney Wick, Archaeology in Reverse, Warming Down, Buried, Off Ground, A Series of Disappointments, Talking to Ants and Best Before End. Gill felt that such local concerns had international significance.

In his later work, Gill has grappled with series that try to extract from, as well as describe the subject matter. With Talking to Ants, he took small found objects and creatures and put them in the film chamber of a camera prior to loading the film. This resulted in "in-camera photograms", which attempting to "evoke the spirit of a place and where intentions meet chance".

Best Before End looks at the phenomenon of energy drink consumption. This time rather than describing the subject, Gill used the drinks as an aid to make the finished images as the negatives partly processed in energy drinks of different kinds. It allowed the drinks to shift and alter the images with a small amount of manual intervention.

Early life 
Gill was born in 1971 in Bristol, UK. He became interested in photography in his early childhood, thanks to his father and Stephen's growing interest in birds, insects and initial obsession with collecting bits of pond life to inspect under his microscope. In 1982 Gill's father, a keen photographer, taught him to process film and print his own pictures in their attic darkroom. In 1985, while still at school, he worked for a local, Bristol-based photography company, copying and restoring old photographs; and helping to make family portraits. Between 1988 and 1991 after leaving school, he worked in a one-hour Photo Lab in Bedminster Bristol. In 1992, he enrolled in the photography foundation course at Filton College in Bristol. In 1994, Gill moved from Bristol to London where he worked at the Magnum Photos agency as a member of staff in the archive, assisting photographers and processing black and white films, first as an intern and then in 1995 full-time. In 1997, he left Magnum to work full-time on his own projects. He lived and worked in Hackney, East London, until 2014. In March 2014, he set up a studio in South Sweden where he now lives with his family.

Books
Books are a key aspect to Gill's practice. He founded his own publishing imprint, Nobody Books, in 2005,  "to exercise maximum control over the publication process of his books" and "to make the book a finished expression of the photographs, rather than just a shell to house them in". Most books were produced using offset printing, though he often experiments with a hands-on, tactile approach, including materials and techniques such as lino cut printing, letter press printing, mono prints, spray paint and rubber stamps. On occasion, entire books are manufactured and assembled in his studio[9] by himself and his assistant Richard, who also distribute the books. His books have received wide international acclaim. Critic Sean O'Hagan, writing in The Guardian in 2010, said "In Britain, Stephen Gill is perhaps the best-known contemporary self-published photographer".  In 2011, PHotoEspaña awarded Stephen Gill’s imprint Nobody "Outstanding Publishing House of the Year" award.

Books by Gill
A Book of Field Studies. London: Chris Boot, 2004. . Introduction by Jon Ronson. Subjects divided into separate series 'Day Return', 'Trolleys Portraits', 'Lost', and 'Trolleys Portraits'.
Invisible. 2005. .
Hackney Wick. London: Self-published / Nobody in association with Archive of Modern Conflict, 2005. .
Buried. 2006. .
Archaeology in Reverse.
London: Self-published / Nobody; Archive of Modern Conflict, 2007. . Afterword by Iain Sinclair. Edition of 3000 copies.
London: Self-published / Nobody; Archive of Modern Conflict, 2007. Special edition in salamander case and including print. Edition of 100 copies.
Hackney Flowers.
London: Self-published / Nobody, 2007. . Edition of 3500 copies.
London: Self-published / Nobody, 2007. Special edition made from waste paper sheets and including a print. Edition of 100 copies.
Anonymous Origami. London: Self-published / Nobody; Archive of Modern Conflict, 2007. .
A Series of Disappointments.
London: Self-published / Nobody; Archive of Modern Conflict, 2008. . Edition of 3000 copies available in three different covers.
London: Self-published / Nobody; Archive of Modern Conflict, 2008. Special edition, in a box with a print and stencil. Edition of 100 copies, mixed covers.
Warming Down. London: Self-published / Nobody, 2008. Photographs taken in Hackney Wick. 15 C-Type prints and one lino print housed in an ex Hackney Library music score book. Edition of 130 copies.
The Hackney Rag. London: Self-published / Nobody; Tokyo: Artbeat, 2009. Newspaper format. Text by Shigeo Goto. Published on the occasion of Gill's first solo exhibition in Japan. Selections from his Hackney series Hackney Wick, Buried, Hackney Flowers, Hackney Flower portraits, Archaeology in Reverse and Warming Down as well as new images. Includes a print. Edition of 1000 copies.
Trinidad 44 photographs. London: Self-published / Nobody, 2009. 44 loose C-Type prints and a dry point etching, housed within the shell of a scooped out 1964 publication. Edition of 115 copies.
Coming up for Air. London: Self-published / Nobody; Archive of Modern Conflict, 2010. .
Outside In. Brighton, England: Photoworks; London: Archive of Modern Conflict, 2010. . Produced as part of Gill's commission to make a series of photographs for the 2010 Brighton Photo Biennial.
B Sides. Companion book to Coming up for Air.
London: Self-published / Nobody, 2010. .
London: Self-published / Nobody, 2010. Special edition in a box with a print. Edition of 100 copies and 5 artist's proofs.
 Off Ground. Text by Iain Sinclair. Photographs of bricks and rocks picked up in the aftermath of the Hackney riots.
London: Self-published / Nobody; Archive of Modern Conflict, 2011. Newspaper format. Edition of 2000 copies.
London: Self-published / Nobody; Archive of Modern Conflict, 2011. Newspaper format. Includes print. Edition of 100 copies.
 Coexistence. 2012. . Edition of 1500 copies, 250 copies of each cover.
Not In Service. London: Self-published / Nobody, 2012. Newspaper format. Published on the occasion of Stephen Gill Best Before End retrospective exhibition at Foam Fotografiemuseum Amsterdam, 16 May – 15 July 2012. Includes image extracts from series Talking to Ants, Off Ground, Hackney Wick, Best Before End, Hammer and Blackberry, Hackney Flowers, A Series of Disappointments, Trolley Portraits and Billboards. Text by Iain Sinclair.
Best Before End. Text by Will Self. Photographs made in East London, colour negative films part processed and soaked in energy drink.
London: Self-published / Nobody, 2014.
London: Self-published / Nobody, 2014. Special edition, in a clamshell box with a print. Edition of 100 copies and 5 artist's proofs.
Talking to Ants. Photographs made in East London between 2009 and 2013.
London: Self-published / Nobody, 2014. . 
London: Self-published / Nobody, 2014. . Special edition, in a clamshell box with a print. Edition of 100 copies and 5 artist's proofs.
Pigeons. London: Self-published / Nobody; Archive of Modern Conflict, 2014. Words by Will Self.

Hackney Kisses. London: Self-published / Nobody; Archive of Modern Conflict, 2014. . Photographer unknown, edited and produced by Gill, words by Timothy Prus.
Night Procession. Self-published / Nobody, 2017. . Photographs by Gill, words by Karl Ove Knausgård.
Self-published / Nobody, 2017. With print. .
The Pillar. Self-published / Nobody, 2019. . Photographs by Gill, words by Karl Ove Knausgård. Winner of the 2019 Les Rencontres de la Photographie author book award. Self-published / Nobody, 2019. .
Please Notify The Sun. Self-published / Nobody, 2021. Photographs by Gill, words by Karl Ove Knausgård.

Books edited by Gill
Unseen UK: a book of photographs by the people at Royal Mail. London: Royal Mail, 2006. .
Bright, Bright Day by Andrei Tarkovsky. London: White Space Gallery, 2008. . Polaroid photographs by Tarkovsky, edited by Gill. Edition of 3000 copies.
Let's Sit Down Before we go by Bertien van Manen. London: Mack, 2011. .
I Will Be Wolf by Bertien van Manen. London: Mack, 2017. .

Exhibitions
2003: Hackney Wick, Photographers' Gallery, London.
2004: Field Studies, Rencontres d’Arles, Arles, France.
2004: Field Studies, Museum of Architecture, Moscow.
2005: Stephen Gill Photographs, Architectural Association School of Architecture, London.
2005: Invisible and Lost, PHotoEspaña, Real Jardín Botánico.
2006: Toronto Photography Festival, Canada.
2007: Anonymous Origami and Buried, Leighton House Museum, London.
2008: A Series of Disappointments, Gungallery, Stockholm.
2009: Hackney Flowers, G/P Gallery, Tokyo.
2010: Coming up for Air, G/P Gallery, Tokyo.
2011: Outside In, Gungallery, Stockholm.
2011: Outside In, G/P Gallery, Tokyo.
2012: Coexistence, CNA, Luxembourg.
2013: Best Before End, Foam Fotografiemuseum Amsterdam, Amsterdam. Exhibition of his London series made between 2000 and 2013.
2014: Talking to Ants, Shoot Gallery, Oslo.
2014: Best Before End, GP Gallery, Tokyo.
2014: Urban Spirit, Christophe Guye Galerie, Zurich, Switzerland
2015: Buried flowers coexist with disappointed ants, Christophe Guye Galerie, Zurich.
2015: London Chronicles, Pôle Image, Rouen.
2015: Talking to Ants, Dillon Gallery, New York.
2015: Myeyefellout, The Photographers' Gallery, London.
2016: Stephen Gill's fatigue laboratory, Christophe Guye Galerie, Zurich.
2018: Stephen Gill. Vom Dokument zum Experiment: Fotografien, Projektionen, Bücher, Objekte (Stephen Gill. From document to experiment: photographs, projections, books and objects), Museum für Photographie, Braunschweig, April–June 2018.
2020: Abstractions, Christophe Guye Galerie, Zurich, Switzerland.

Collections 

Gill's photographic work is held in various collections including:
Victoria and Albert Museum, London
National Portrait Gallery, London
The Tate, London
Sprengel Museum, Hanover
Museum of London, London
Archive of Modern Conflict, London

Quotes
Iain Sinclair:

Stephen Gill has learnt this: to haunt the places that haunt him. His photo-accumulations demonstrate a tender vision factored out of experience; alert, watchful, not overeager, wary of that mendacious conceit, ‘closure’. There is always flow, momentum, the sense of a man passing through a place that delights him. A sense of stepping down, immediate engagement, politic exchange. Then he remounts the bicycle and away. Loving retrievals, like a letter to a friend, never possession… What I like about Stephen Gill is that he has learnt to give us only as much as we need, the bones of the bones of the bones…

According to Martin Parr (writing in 2004):

Stephen Gill is emerging as a major force in British photography. His best work is a hybrid between documentary and conceptual work and for this international it is the repeated exploration of one idea, executed with the precision that makes these series so fascinating and illuminating. Gill brings a very British, understated irony into portrait and landscape photography.

Jon Ronson, writing in 2004 about Field Studies, was reminded of the Observer's Books:
Stephen's photos have all the naive gusto of the Observer series of old [. . .] Mercifully lacking in malevolence, they are also wise and modern and beautifully laden with tiny, understated details about the way we live today. [. . .] When you look at a Martin Parr photograph, everything about it says, instantly, Martin Parr. Stephen's photographs, however, are so subtle, so seemingly un-authored, it's only when you stare at them en masse and one after the other, you realise that they can only have been taken by Stephen Gill. There is a tremendous, quiet, respectful, cumulative power to his work.

References

External links
 
 Gallery at Christophe Guye Galerie
 Nobody Books
 About Best Before End, Will Self: my energy-drink addiction, at The Guardian
 Review: Stephen Gill’s “Best Before End” at FOAM
 Review of Pigeons at The Financial Times
 Video of Best Before End at Foam
 Review of Coexistence at Time
 Interview about Outside In at The Morning News
 About Coming Up For Air at The Telegraph
 Self-publish or be damned: why photographers are going it alone at The Guardian
 About Hackney Wick at Hackney Citizen
 Review of Archaeology in Reverse at The Guardian
 Review of Hackney Wick at The Guardian
 About Invisible at The Guardian

1971 births
Living people
Photographers from Bristol